Francis Stanley Banks (born 21 August 1945) is an English former footballer who played as a right-back.

Club career
In 1962, Banks graduated from Southend United's academy to the first team, making four Football League appearances for the club before moving to hometown club Hull City in September 1966. At Hull, Bank made 288 league appearances, scoring six times, over the course of ten years before moving back to Southend in March 1976. In his second spell at Southend, Banks made 75 league appearances, helping the club to win the Fourth Division in the 1980–81 season.

Banks later played for south Essex-based clubs Great Wakering Rovers and Purfleet before retiring from playing.

Coaching career
Following his playing career, Banks returned to Southend United, taking up roles as a coach, reserve and youth team manager. On 22 July 1991, Banks was appointed manager of Essex Senior League club Southend Manor.

References

Living people
1945 births
English footballers
Footballers from Kingston upon Hull
Association football fullbacks
English Football League players
Southend United F.C. players
Hull City A.F.C. players
Great Wakering Rovers F.C. players
Thurrock F.C. players
English football managers
Association football coaches
Southend Manor F.C. managers
Southend United F.C. non-playing staff